Mushakhan (also Romanized as Mūshākhān; also known as Mūchākhānī) is a village in Poshtdarband Rural District, in the Central District of Kermanshah County, Kermanshah Province, Iran. At the 2006 census, its population was 207, in 44 families.

References 

Populated places in Kermanshah County